Howden railway station serves the town of Howden in the East Riding of Yorkshire, England. The station is managed by Northern, but is also served by TransPennine Express and Hull Trains.

History
The station was originally opened by the Hull and Selby Railway (H&SR) on 1 July 1840 as Howden and Bubwith, and was renamed as Howden on 16 April 1869. In 1885 the Hull and Barnsley Railway (H&BR) opened its own Howden station on the northern edge of Howden itself. On 1 July 1922 the H&SR station was renamed North Howden, while the H&BR station was renamed South Howden. North Howden reverted to Howden on 12 June 1961, following South Howden's closure to passengers in 1955. In 1987 Howden station was designated a Grade II listed building and is now recorded in the National Heritage List for England, maintained by Historic England.

Facilities
The station is not staffed and has no ticket machine; as such passengers must buy their tickets on the train or in advance of travel.  The former buildings still stand, but are now in residential use.  The platforms are staggered either side of a level crossing - this provides step-free access to both and the link between them.  There are shelters on both platforms, along with digital information screens.  Train running information can also be gained from timetable posters and by telephone.

Services
The station now has a regular frequency service (approximately hourly each way), thanks to recent improvements in the York to Hull line timetable. All westbound trains call at Selby and then continue to either York (Northern) or London King's Cross (Hull Trains). There is also a limited service to Leeds and Manchester Piccadilly (a.m. peak only). Eastbound there is at least one departure per hour to Hull provided by the various operators that call there.

On Sundays, five services are provided by Hull Trains and eight services are provided by Northern in each direction at various points throughout the day.

References

External links 

Railway stations in the East Riding of Yorkshire
DfT Category F1 stations
Former Hull and Selby Railway stations
Railway stations in Great Britain opened in 1840
Railway stations served by Hull Trains
Northern franchise railway stations
Railway stations served by TransPennine Express
Grade II listed buildings in the East Riding of Yorkshire
Howden
Grade II listed railway stations